"You Learn" is a song by the Swedish rock band Takida and was the third single released from their The Burning Heart album. The song was released as a single on 21 November 2011.

Chart performance
The song entered the Swedish Top 60 at fifty-two on 4 November 2011 and peaked at number five on 27 January 2012. All and all it spent a total of 29 weeks on the chart which makes it the second Takida's longest running single in the chart.

References

Takida songs
2011 songs